Israel 'Junior' Alexander Ore (born 8 September 1992) is an American tennis player. He has a career high ATP singles ranking of World No. 737 achieved on 23 July 2018. He also has a career high ATP doubles ranking of World No. 269 achieved on 16 March 2020. Ore has reached 32 career doubles finals, with a record of 20 wins and 12 losses all coming at the ITF level. On the junior tour, Ore had a career high junior ranking of 19, achieved in February 2010.

Professional career
Ore made his ATP Tour main draw debut at the 2008 Washington Open on hard courts in the US, where he was given a wild card entry into the doubles main draw alongside compatriot Denis Kudla. They were defeated handily in the first round by Argentine duo Lucas Arnold Ker and Eduardo Schwank in straight sets 1–6, 1–6.

ATP Challenger and ITF Futures finals

Doubles: 32 (20–12)

External links

1992 births
Living people
American male tennis players
People from Gaithersburg, Maryland
Texas A&M Aggies
Tennis people from Maryland
Texas A&M Aggies men's tennis players
20th-century American people
21st-century American people